Luke Mathews (born 21 June 1995) is an Australian middle-distance runner who competes in the 800 metres and 1500 metres. He represented his country in both events at the 2016 Summer Olympics. As well as in the 4 × 800 m at the 2017 IAAF World Relays, the 1500m at the 2017 IAAF World Championships and in both events at the 2018 Commonwealth Games. He also competed for Australia at 2019 World Athletics Championships in the 800 m.

Athletics career

Born in Williamstown, Melbourne, Mathews made his international debut at the 2014 World Junior Championships in Athletics, being a semi-finalist in the 800 metres. He made his breakthrough at senior level in 2016. After a win at the Hunter Track Classic he then ran world record holder David Rudisha to the line at the Melbourne Track Classic, recording a personal best of 1:45.16 minutes. It was the fastest time for the 800 m by an Australian in Australia for nearly 35 years.

He was selected to compete for Australia at the 2016 Summer Olympics in both 800 m and 1500 m. He was eliminated in the heats stages.
He competed for Australia at the 2017 IAAF World Championships in the 1500 m. He finished 1st in his Heat with the overall fastest time. He was just eliminated in the Semi-Final.
He competed for Australia at the 2018 Commonwealth Games in both 800 m and 1500 m. He finished 3rd with a Bronze Medal in the 800m Final. He also made the Final of the 1500m.
He competed for Australia at the 2019 World Athletics Championships in the 800 m. He finished 7th in his Heat.

Personal life
Mathews grew up in Werribee and Newport, Victoria and attended St Kevin's College, Melbourne.

He was also a talented junior Australian Rules Footballer having a stint with the Western Jets before turning his focus to athletics.

He is currently studying a Bachelor of Commerce/Laws at Deakin University.

Luke also owns a sausage dog named, Louis.

Personal bests
600 metres – 1:18.05 min (2016)
800 metres – 1:45.16 min (2016)
1000 metres – 2:19.57 min (2017)
1500 metres – 3:35.57 min (2017)
Mile run – 3:54.53 min (2017)
3000 metres – 8:23.10 min (2012)
5000 metres – 14:36.80 min (2014)
Mile run (road) – 4:03.0 (2016)

All information from All-Athletics profile.

International competitions

References

External links

Living people
1995 births
Athletes from Melbourne
Australian male middle-distance runners
Olympic athletes of Australia
Athletes (track and field) at the 2016 Summer Olympics
World Athletics Championships athletes for Australia
Athletes (track and field) at the 2018 Commonwealth Games
Commonwealth Games medallists in athletics
Commonwealth Games bronze medallists for Australia
Australian Athletics Championships winners
People educated at St Kevin's College, Melbourne
People from Williamstown, Victoria
Medallists at the 2018 Commonwealth Games